The City of Bradford Metropolitan District Council elections were held on Thursday, 8 May 1986, with one third of the council and a vacancy in Odsal to be elected. The elections resulted in Labour gaining control of the council.

Election result

This result had the following consequences for the total number of seats on the council after the elections:

Ward results

References

1986 English local elections
1986
1980s in West Yorkshire